Jaydev Dipakbhai Unadkat (born 18 October 1991) is an Indian professional cricketer who has played for the Indian national team. He plays for Saurashtra in domestic cricket. He represented India in the Under-19 Cricket World Cup in 2010. In March 2020, Unadkat became the first man to captain Saurashtra to the Ranji Trophy title.In December 2022, Unadkat returned in the Test XI after 12 years.

Domestic career 
Domestically Unadkat plays for Saurashtra. He has played for a number of teams in the Indian Premier League. When he was selected by Royal Challengers Bangalore in 2013 he was one of the costliest Indian players. In May 2013 he achieved his best T20 career bowling figures of 5/25 playing against Delhi Daredevils and was named Player of the Match.

In 2014, he was selected by Delhi in that year's IPL auction, and in February 2016 Kolkata Knight Riders made the winning bid in that auction, to secure Unadkat's services. In February 2017, he moved again, this time to Rising Pune Supergiants. In the 10th IPL he took a hat-trick against Sunrisers Hyderabad during the final over of the match which was a wicket maiden over.

In July 2018, he was named in the squad for India Blue for the 2018–19 Duleep Trophy and in October 2018 was named in India B's squad for the 2018–19 Deodhar Trophy.

In January 2019, he became the second bowler for Saurashtra to take 200 wickets in the Ranji Trophy and in August 2019 was named in the India Red team's squad for the 2019–20 Duleep Trophy before being named for India A for the 2019–20 Deodhar Trophy. He was the leading wicket-taker in the 2019–20 Ranji Trophy, with 67 dismissals in ten matches.

Jaydev Unadkat has not played a Test since his debut in 2010.

In February 2022, he was bought by the Mumbai Indians in the auction for the 2022 Indian Premier League tournament.

On 23 December 2022, he was bought by the Lucknow Super Giants in the IPL auction for the 2023 Indian Premier League tournament.

International career
After playing for India's under-19 side in England in 2010, taking 13 wickets on his first-class cricket debut against West Indies under-19s at Grace Road, Unadkat was used as a net bowler for the Indian national side in Sri Lanka before making his international debut for India against South Africa in December 2010 in the first Test at Centurion. 

In the 2nd Test against Bangladesh on 22nd December 2022 at Mirpur, Unadkat was named as a replacement to Kuldeep Yadav.
Jaydev Unadkat made his comeback to the Test side after 12 years.

Unadkat made his Twenty20 International (T20I) debut against Zimbabwe at Harare Sports Club in June 2016.

References

External links 
 Jaidev Unadkat's profile page on Wisden
 Jaydev Unadkat Royal Challenger 

Indian cricketers
India Test cricketers
India One Day International cricketers
India Twenty20 International cricketers
Saurashtra cricketers
Kolkata Knight Riders cricketers
Royal Challengers Bangalore cricketers
Rising Pune Supergiant cricketers
Rajasthan Royals cricketers
West Zone cricketers
India Blue cricketers
India Red cricketers
Living people
1991 births
Mumbai Indians cricketers